Come Again may refer to:

 Come Again (The Jaggerz album), 1975
 Come Again (Thornley album) or the title song, 2004
 "Come Again" (Dowland), a 16th-century song by John Dowland
 "Come Again (The Quetzal)", a 2012 song by Soluna Samay
 "Come Again", a song by Kurt Vile from Bottle It In
 "Come Again", a song by Staind from Tormented
 "Come Again", a song by Swizz Beatz from Poison
 Derek and Clive Come Again, a 1977 album by Derek and Clive
 Come Again (novel), a 2020 novel by Robert Webb